TÜVs (short for) are internationally active, independent service companies from Germany and Austria that test, inspect and certify technical systems, facilities and objects of all kinds in order to minimize hazards and prevent damages. The TÜV companies are organized into three large holding companies, TÜV Nord, TÜV Rheinland and TÜV SÜD (with TÜV Hessen), along with the smaller independent companies TÜV Thüringen, TÜV Saarland and TÜV Austria.

History
With the increasing number and efficiency of steam engines during the Industrial Revolution, there had been more and more accidents caused by exploding (or more precisely, bursting) boilers. After the explosion of the boiler at the Mannheim Aktienbrauerei in January 1865, the idea was pursued there to subject boilers to regular inspections on a voluntary basis, as was already the case in Great Britain. Twenty boiler owners in Baden joined in the plans and finally founded the "Gesellschaft zur Ueberwachung und Versicherung von Dampfkesseln" (Society for the Supervision and Insurance of Steam Boilers) on 6 January 1866 in the rooms of the Mannheim Stock Exchange. It was the first inspection society on the European mainland. Other German states and regions followed suit.

These independent regional monitoring organizations in the form of associations were so successful in accident prevention that, from 1871, membership in such an association exempted them from inspection by a state inspector. The regional "Dampfkessel-Überwachungs- und Revisions-Vereine" (DÜV), as self-help organizations of steam boiler operators, were thus an early example of a very successful privatization of previously state inspections. Because they were so successful in preventing accidents in the rapidly developing field of steam boiler technology, they were later also entrusted with safety inspections in other technical fields, including the periodic testing of motor vehicles as well as driver's license testing.

All TÜV groups that emerged from these common roots use the "TÜV" brand and a regional suffix (for example, TÜV SÜD, TÜV Rheinland, TÜV Nord, TÜV Saarland, TÜV Thüringen, TÜV Austria) in their names. They compete with each other and with other market players in some areas (see above).

The individual TÜVs became multinational corporations with time, and came to provide services to industry, governments, individuals, and non-profit groups. During the 1980s and 1990s, deregulation led to competition in the German inspection and certification industry, and further deregulation occurred at the end of 2007.

In 2007, TÜV Nord and TÜV SÜD agreed to merge, which would have created a company with 18,000 employees and sales of around 1.8 billion euros; however the companies called off the merger that same year, citing potential difficulties with integration as well as restrictions that would have been required under antitrust law. In 2008, TÜV SÜD and TÜV Rheinland agreed to merge which would have created the second largest testing services company in the world, behind SGS S.A.; the combined company would have had around 25,000 employees and 2.2 billion euros in income. These plans were abandoned by August again due to antitrust concerns. TÜV Nord had more than 11,000 employees stationed globally as of 2020.

Responsibilities and structure
All TÜVs perform sovereign tasks in the fields of vehicle monitoring, driver licensing and equipment and product safety. In addition, TÜVs function as notified bodies in Europe for medical device regulation.

Every company that uses the word "TÜV" in its name is at least 25.1% owned by a "Technischer Überwachungs-Verein e. V." (Technical Inspection Association), which is a non-governmental organization of the German business community and has been entrusted by the state with the specified sovereign tasks ("TÜV Convention").

As a result of deregulation and liberalization, the former regional responsibility in Germany has been abolished in most areas of work. In these areas, as well as in the unregulated sector, the companies operate independently on the market and compete with each other. In many areas such as product certification and certification of management systems, they are represented worldwide by subsidiaries.

Organizations that imitate TÜV have also established themselves outside the German-speaking world. TÜV India, which is a subsidiary of TÜV Nord, has been operating in India since 1989. TÜV offices have also been operating in Turkey since 2007. The operator is TÜVtürk, a subsidiary of TÜV SÜD.

TÜV Hessen
TÜV Hessen (TÜV Technische Überwachung Hessen GmbH) is based in Darmstadt. According to its origins, the company is a purely technical testing organization, but with its focus on testing and certification now operates in a broad field within the service industry. It currently employs around 1350 people and generated annual sales of around €157 million in fiscal 2019. TÜV Hessen has been 55% owned by TÜV Süd AG and 45% by the state of Hesse since 1999.

TÜV SÜD

TÜV SÜD AG is a management holding company with 74.9 percent of the shares owned by TÜV SÜD e.V. (registered association) and 25.1 percent owned by the TÜV SÜD Foundation. In 2021, it generated annual sales of €2.7 billion with 25,000+ employees. As of June 2022, TÜV SÜD listed more than 1,000 locations throughout Germany, Europe, America, and Asia. Around 40 percent of sales are generated abroad.

TÜV Nord

TÜV NORD AG is an based in Hanover. Its main tasks are testing and certification in the business areas of industry, automotive, and human resources and education. As a stock corporation, the company was founded in 2004. The shares of the company are held by TÜV NORD e. V. (36.1%), RWTÜV e. V. (36.1%) and TÜV Hannover/Sachsen-Anhalt e. V. (27.8%).

TÜV Saarland
TÜV Saarland emerged from the Pfälzischer Dampfkessel-Revisions-Verein (Palatinate Steam Boiler Auditing Association) founded in 1871 and is headquartered in Sulzbach. The Chairman of the Board of TÜV Saarland is Thomas Klein. TÜV Saarland Holding GmbH is 74.9 percent owned by TÜV Saarland e.V. and 25.1 percent by the TÜV Saarland Foundation. The managing directors of TÜV Saarland Holding GmbH are Carsten Schubert (spokesman) and Thorsten Greiner.

TÜV Thüringen
TÜV Thüringen is headquartered in Erfurt. TÜV Thüringen is set up as a group of companies and competes with the other testing organizations. The TÜV Thüringen group of companies has its main focus in central Germany and operates throughout Germany and worldwide. It has more than 1,000 employees at ten locations in Germany as well as numerous automotive testing facilities in twelve countries.

TÜV Rheinland
TÜV Rheinland AG is based in Cologne. TÜV Rheinland operates as a technical testing organization in the areas of safety, efficiency and quality. Chairman of the Executive Board of TÜV Rheinland AG is Michael Fübi, Chairman of the Supervisory Board is Michael Hüther. The sole shareholder of TÜV Rheinland AG is TÜV Rheinland Berlin Brandenburg Pfalz e. V.. With 19,924 employees, TÜV Rheinland generated sales of 1.97 billion euros and earnings before interest and taxes of 130.6 million euros in 2017. In terms of sales, 45 percent was attributable to business outside Germany. 11,420 employees work outside Germany, 8,504 in Germany.

TÜV Austria
In Austria, TÜV Austria, which dates back to its foundation as a monitoring association in 1872, has evolved into the internationally active TÜV Austria Group.

The brand "TÜV"
The "TÜV" brand is a highly recognizable trademark protected for the benefit of these testing organizations and the VdTÜV. It is a valuable asset of the TÜV testing companies.

"TÜV" became known to the general public primarily through the general inspection. In Germany, the term "TÜV" is informally used to denote the compulsory biennial or triennial vehicle inspection procedure (similar to the term "MOT" in the United Kingdom, e.g., you take your car "to the TÜV", even though vehicle inspections are now also often inspected by another organization such as Dekra, KÜS or GTÜ, since the former monopoly for this inspection has long been dissolved).

In addition, "TÜV-geprüft" colloquially means a seal of quality for technical testing by a TÜV company (see above). The designation "TÜV-tested" may only be used by a technical inspection association or a subsidiary. Anything else would be misleading consumers or unfair competition. This seal of quality is also increasingly being abused by falsification.[3]

Because "the TÜV" enjoys a high reputation for neutrality and expertise in Germany and Austria, but now also worldwide, and has a high degree of recognition, the designation is applied in colloquial language to many social problem areas and grievances when there are calls for control and transparency (e.g. "Bureaucracy TÜV", "School TÜV", "Event TÜV").

TÜV Association
The TÜV Association or TÜV-Verband e. V. in German (formerly VdTÜV or Verband der TÜV e. V.) represents the interests of the Technical Inspection Associations (TÜV) in Germany and Europe vis a vis politics, authorities, economy and the public. The association has its headquarters in Berlin and also maintains an EU representation in Brussels.

The aim of the TÜV Association is to improve the technical and digital safety of vehicles, products, systems and services through independent assessments. Together with its members, the TÜV Association pursues the goal of maintaining the high level of technical safety in our society and creating trust for the digital world. To achieve this, the experts of the TÜV Association are involved in the further development of standards and regulations. Currently, the main focus is on strengthening digital security and meeting the growing demands for sustainability in our society. 

Since June 2020, Dirk Stenkamp, Chairman of the Board of Management of TÜV NORD AG, has been Chairman of the TÜV Association. The chairmanship rotates every two years. Since 2017, Joachim Bühler has been Managing Director of the TÜV Association. 

The TÜV Association has six main members. In addition, there are two industry members and five associate members.

Main members 
 TÜV SÜD
 TÜV Hessen
 TÜV Nord
 TÜV Thüringen
 TÜV Saarland
 TÜV Rheinland
 TÜV Austria

Scandals
Over the years, there have been various scandals regarding the services provided by the different TUVs.

Brazilian dam disaster
TÜV SÜD was auditing and certifying Vale, a company that was involved in the 2015 Mariana dam disaster. In 2019, the Brumadinho dam disaster occurred. In October 2019, five Brazilians who lost close family members there and two NGOs filed a law infringement complaint against  TÜV SÜD, alleging that TÜV SÜD is jointly responsible for the deaths and environmental damage. The company denies the allegations.

On 25 January 2019 a recently inspected tailing dam collapsed, killing 270 people, of whom 259 were officially confirmed dead and 11 others reported as missing, whose bodies had not been found. The Brumadinho dam disaster released a mudflow that advanced over houses in a rural area near the city. Brazilian authorities issued arrest warrants for two engineers of TÜV SÜD, contracted to inspect the dam. Brazilian prosecutors announced, on 21 January 2020, that Vale, TÜV SÜD, and 16 individuals would be charged in relation to the dam disaster.

In 2020, Brazilian prosecutors announced their plans to file charges against Vale SA and its auditor TÜV SÜD and many individuals.

Deficient breast implants
In 2013, TÜV Rheinland was held liable by a French court to 1600 women whose breast implants had ruptured; the implants were made by Poly Implant Prothèse with TÜV Rheinland having certified the manufacturing process.

See also
 CE marking
 Cybersecurity standards
 Explosion protection
 Functional safety
 Nationally Recognized Testing Laboratory
 Security

References

1866 establishments in Germany
1872 establishments in Austria
Automotive testing agencies
Environmental certification marks
German brands
Austrian brands
Product certification
Service companies of Germany
Standards organisations in Germany
Service companies of Austria
Standards organisations in Austria